Oak Grove High School can refer to:

 Oak Grove High School (Jefferson County, Alabama)
 Oak Grove High School (Pulaski County, Arkansas)
 Oak Grove High School (San Jose, California)
 Oak Grove High School (Oak Grove, Louisiana), in West Carroll Parish
 Oak Grove High School (Hattiesburg, Mississippi)
 Oak Grove High School (North Carolina)

See also 
 Grove High School (disambiguation)
 Oak Grove School (disambiguation)